{{Infobox film
| name           = Monpura
| image          = Monpura_Poster.jpg
| alt            = 
| caption        = Film poster
| director       = Giasuddin Selim
| writer         = Giasuddin Selim
| producer       = Anjan Chowdhury
| starring       = 
| cinematography = Kamrul Hasan Khasru
| editing        = Iqbal E. Kabir
| music          = Iqbal E. Kabir
| studio         = 
| distributor    = Maasranga Production
| released       = <ref>The Daily Star, 4 February 2009 'Monpura' to be released Feb 13 accessed: 12 May 2011</ref>
| runtime        = 138 minutes
| country        = Bangladesh
| language       = Bengali
| budget         = 
| gross          = 
}}Monpura, is a 2009 Bangladeshi Bengali film, directed by Giasuddin Selim. The film was remade into Indian Bengali in 2010 as Achin Pakhi, which was directed by Anjan Das. Monpura is a romantic tragedy film set in rural Bangladesh. The shooting took place in various locations, including Dhunat in Bogra, Kushtia and Dhaka.

Chanchal Chowdhury plays the role of Shonai. Farhana Mili made her debut in the role of Pori, the daughter of a fisherman. The young couple are supported by veteran actors Mamunur Rashid and Fazlur Rahman Babu.

As Selim's large-screen debut and contemporary-folk soundtrack were released ahead of screening which was an instant hit, it received a huge media hype even before its release. It saw a record amount of box collections in the first week of release. Its soundtrack album became one of the most popular in the country. Monpura is the highest-grossing Bangladeshi film of 2009 and the 7th highest-grossing film of all time. The film received positive reactions from the fans, especially for its direction and visuals, which captured the rural life of Bangladeshi people. It is cited as one of the most prolific films of the new era of Bangladeshi movies, which saw critical acclaim overseas 

 Plot 
Shonai is a man-servant in the house of Gazi, a rich man. The son of Gazi, Halim, is mentally unstable, and he murders a woman who worked in that house. But Gazi insists Shonai take the responsibility of the murder and leaves him alone in an island named "Monpura", where he falls in love with Pori, the daughter of a fisherman. Gazi, seeing Pori one day, intends to marry his son, Halim, with her, although he pledged to Shonai that he would propose Pori's father for his marriage. At first, her father did not accept the proposal, for he did not want to let her daughter marry a maniac. But when Gazi wanted to give his property to Pori, he accepted the proposal. When Shonai discovers Gazi's plot, he went to Pori and the two decided to flee on the next night. But as the time came for Shonai to leave, the police arrested him for the murder case. Pori was married to Halim. Pori was waiting for Shonai, and he wanted to be free to meet her. So wife of Gazi said that Shonai will be executed on Friday at 12:01 am so that she might forget Shonai. Shonai was proven innocent and was released on Saturday, although Pori, who thought that he will be executed on Friday, killed herself at midnight that day. After Shonai arrives the next morning, he finds out and feels devastated by Pori's death.

Cast
 Chanchal Chowdhury as Shonai, a fisherman who lives on Monpura Island. He has a little house there, talks with animals, and falls in love with Pori. He is also a fast swimmer.
 Farhana Mili as Pori, daughter of another fisherman. She falls in love with Shonai Mia but is forced to marry Shonai's foe.
 Fazlur Rahman Babu as Pori's Father, another fisherman
 Mamunur Rashid as Gazi
 Monir Khan Shimul

 Production 

DevelopmentMonpura made a huge media hype before its release. "A heart breaking story," as called by popular actor and director Afzal Hossain, its unusual songs and rural setting set the background of an artistic romance film. Monpura, unlike many other popular Bangla films, uses the rural settings of Bangladesh, something Selim says audiences have a strong attachment to.

Shooting
The shooting started in June 2007. The shooting unit faced problems due to Bangladesh's rainy season and demands to shoot through such weather; several outdoor sequences were shot in the rain.

 Reception Monpura initially released in four theaters in Dhaka and Rajshahi, but it quickly opened in theaters in Chittagong, Mymensingh, Bogra, Rangpur, and Sirajganj.

Within three weeks of its release, Monpura broke the 45-year record of ticket sales in the Dhaka box office with over 50,000 tickets sold, surpassing the first Bangla language film made in Bangladesh, Mukh O Mukhosh (1956).

On 22 May 2009, Monpura completed its 100 days of glory in the box office. Star Cineplex and Bolaka (Bolaka-1 & Bolaka-2), the busiest theaters in the capital, ran this film for 100 days consecutively. After 100 days, the movie kept running in about 50 theaters across the country.

The film ran at Star Cineplex for nine months, Bolaka for six months, and Monihar for eight weeks. Theaters in Pabna, Khulna, and other districts in Bangladesh ran the film for six to seven weeks. Outside Bangladesh, the film was first released in Sydney on 8 August 2009, and then in other cities, including New York City, Toronto, Montreal, and Brussels.

Remake
West Bengal filmmaker Anjan Das made the Indian Bengali film, Achin Pakhi (2010), based on Monpura.

Awards

National Film AwardsMonpura won in five categories at the National Film Awards, including Best Film.

 Winner Best Film: Anjan Chowduhry Pintu
 Winner Best Actor: Chanchal Chowdhury (Shared with Ferdous for Gongajatra)
 Winner Best Villain Character: Mamunur Rashid
 Winner Best Screenplay: Giasuddin Selim
 Winner Best Singer: Chondona Mazumder and Kazi Krishnokoli Islam

Meril-Prothom Alo Awards

 Winner Best Film Actor: Mamunur Rashid

 Music 

Bangla films rarely come under the spotlight by their music. It was thought that the music from Monpura'' was collected from Bangladeshi folk music, but almost all are original songs. The album has been noted for its depth, creative thought, and trend-breaking effort.

"Shonai Hai Haire," written by director Giasuddin Selim, tells the story of a daughter's death, whose funeral is attended by her father and father-in-law. "Aage Jodi Jantam," lyrics and music by Krishnokoli Islam, also tells the story of a broken heart - leaving the house of a girl and her life of regret. "Shonar Moyna Pakhi," lyrics and music by Osman Khan and sung by Arnob, expresses the desire to see a loved one at any cost, even if it comes before one's death. The album was released in August 2008 by Laser Vision.

Track

সহকারি সঙ্গীত পরিচালক: অদিত। (Assistant Music Director: Odit.)
বাঁশী: জালাল। ঢোল: নজরুল। সন্তুর: স্বপন।(Flute: Jalal. Dhol: Nazrul. Sontur: Swopon)
দোতারা: শরীফ, গৌরব। (Dotara: Shorif, Gourob)

Recorded: at Bengal Studio.

AudioCD Cover Photography: Tanvir

Music arranged & composed for songs by Arnob

Script, Dialogue and Direction : Gias Uddin Selim

Cinematography: Kamrul Hasan Khosru

Edit & Music Direction : Iqbal A. Kabir Joel

References

External links
 
 Monpura at the Rotten Tomatoes

2009 films
2009 romance films
Love trilogy (film series)
Bengali-language Bangladeshi films
Bangladeshi romance films
Films scored by Arnob
2000s Bengali-language films
Best Film National Film Award (Bangladesh) winners
Films whose writer won the Best Screenplay National Film Award (Bangladesh)